Pierre Ballester (1959) is a French sports journalist. He has written extensively about doping in cycling.

Career 

He was a correspondent in London for Agence France-Presse, Sport, and L'Equipe.

Ballester co-wrote L.A. Confidentiel with David Walsh. It was published in 2004 by La Martinière. The book resulted in a number of lawsuits by Lance Armstrong's lawyers in France and England.

He also co-wrote Le Sale Tour (a pun in French : literally « the dirty tour », for Tour de France, double entending « dirty trick [also 'tour' in french] » ) with Walsh, about Armstrong's "comeback" in the 2009-2010 period.

Bibliography 
 Le sale Tour, with David Walsh - Seuil - 2009 - 
 Tempêtes sur le Tour -  Éditions du Rocher - 2008 - 
 L.A. Officiel''' co-écrit avec David Walsh - Éditions de La Martinière - 2006 - 
 La France du rugby - Éditions Panama - 2006 - 
 L.A. Confidentiel - Les secrets de Lance Armstrong'' co-écrit avec David Walsh - Points - 2004 -

References

1959 births
Living people
French sports journalists
Cycling journalists
Cycling writers
French male non-fiction writers